Zavadiv (Zavadov) derives from the word zavada/zawada which literally means "obstacle" in several Slavic languages. It may refer to several places in Lviv Oblast, Ukraine:

Zavadiv, Mostyska Raion, village in Mostyska Raion
Zavadiv, Stryi Raion, village in Stryi Raion
Zavadiv, Yavoriv Raion, village in Yavoriv Raion
Zavadiv, Zhovkva Raion, village in Zhovkva Raion